Frank Dundr ( Butz; born 25 January 1957) is a German rower, who competed for the SC Dynamo Berlin / Sportvereinigung (SV) Dynamo. 

Butz was born in 1957. He married in 1977 and took on his wife's surname Dundr.

He won the medals at the international rowing competitions.  In February 1978, he was given two sports awards: Master of Sport and Honored Master of Sports.

References

External links 
 

1957 births
Living people
People from Sonneberg
People from Bezirk Suhl
East German male rowers
Sportspeople from Thuringia
Olympic medalists in rowing
World Rowing Championships medalists for East Germany
Olympic gold medalists for East Germany
Recipients of the Patriotic Order of Merit in gold
Olympic rowers of East Germany
Rowers at the 1980 Summer Olympics
Recipients of the Master of Sport
Recipients of the Honoured Master of Sport
Medalists at the 1980 Summer Olympics